Inside the Actors Studio is a series on the Bravo cable television channel, hosted by James Lipton from 1994 to 2018, and on Ovation since 2019 with an alternating list of hosts. It is produced and directed by Jeff Wurtz; the executive producer is James Lipton. The program, which premiered in 1994, is distributed internationally by CABLEready and is broadcast in 125 countries around the world reaching 89,000,000 homes. It is currently taped at the Michael Schimmel Center for the Arts at Pace University's New York City campus.

Many of the available episode guides conflict with one another regarding the numbering of episodes and in some cases are internally inconsistent.  The numbering here is a complete and internally consistent list created from other available episode guides for the show.

Episodes

Season 1 (1994)

Season 2 (1995)

Season 3 (1996)

Season 4 (1998)

Season 5 (1998–99)

Season 6 (1999–2000)

Season 7 (2000–01)

Season 8 (2001–02)

Season 9 (2002–03)

Season 10 (2003–04)

Season 11 (2004–05)

Season 12 (2005–06)

Season 13 (2006–07)

Season 14 (2008)

Season 15 (2008–09)

Season 16 (2009–10)

Season 17 (2010–11)

Season 18 (2012)

Season 19 (2013–14)

Season 20 (2014–15)

Season 21 (2015–16)

Season 22 (2016–18)

Season 23 (2019)
NOTE:  Starting with Season 23, the first on Ovation, the host is now a rotating list.  The host is included in this list.

References

External links
Official Site at BravoTV.com

Inside
Actors Studio